Preet Kaur Gill (Punjabi: ਪ੍ਰੀਤ ਕੌਰ ਗਿੱਲ, born 21 November 1972) is a British politician serving as Shadow Cabinet Minister for International Development since 2020. A member of the Labour and Co-operative parties, she has been Member of Parliament (MP) for Birmingham Edgbaston since 2017.

Early life
Preet Kaur Gill was born on 21 November 1972 in Edgbaston, Birmingham, in the English West Midlands to Indian parents Daljit Singh Shergill and Kuldeep Kaur Shergill. Her father was a foreman, and later a bus driver, and her mother worked as a seamstress. Daljit Singh was the longest serving president of the Guru Nanak Gurdwara Smethwick. Gill credits her father and Baron Tarsem King of West Bromwich as her main inspirations for her ambition to enter politics.

She has six younger siblings. Her early education was at Lordswood Girls' School and Bournville College. At the latter, Gill was elected as student president. Gill graduated from the University of East London with a first-class BSc in sociology with social work. After graduating, she worked as a social worker in a kibbutz in Israel and with street children in India. She was a social worker in Waltham Forest and Birmingham specialising in child protection and serving as children's services manager in Birmingham from 2010–2017.

She was elected as a councillor for Sandwell Metropolitan Borough Council in 2012 and re-elected in the 2016 local election; her term ended May 2018. On the council, she served as the Cabinet Member for Public Health and Protection.

Gill supported remaining within the European Union (EU) in the 2016 EU membership referendum.

Parliamentary career
Gill was selected by the Labour Party to contest Birmingham Edgbaston on 28 April 2017. Her selection followed Gisela Stuart's decision not to seek re-election. In the 2017 general election, Gill held the seat for Labour with 24,124 (55.3%) votes and a majority of 6,917 (15.8%). She is the first female British Sikh MP.

In July 2017, she was elected as a member of the Home Affairs Select Committee.

On 12 January 2018, she was appointed to the shadow cabinet as International Development Minister (role shared with Dan Carden).

In March 2019, Gill signed a letter supporting the People's Vote campaign for a second referendum on EU membership.

Gill is the chair of the All Party Parliamentary Groups on Mentoring and for British Sikhs.

Gill supported Keir Starmer in the 2020 Labour Party leadership election. She was promoted to Shadow Secretary of State for International Development following Starmer's election as leader.

As Shadow Secretary of State, Gill initially shadowed Secretary Anne-Marie Trevelyan until the department was abolished in September 2020; since then she shadowed ministers of the newly created Foreign, Commonwealth and Development Office. She remained in the shadow cabinet following the November 2021 reshuffle, but her position was re-named Shadow Cabinet Minister for International Development and she joined the new shadow Foreign and Commonwealth Affairs team.

In November 2020, Gill was elected Chair of the Co-operative Party Parliamentary Group of MPs.

Controversy

On 19 December 2021 Preet Kaur Gill, came under fire on social media over a tweet she later deleted that referred to a “Hindu terrorist” behind the act of violence at Golden Temple in Amritsar.

On 23 February 2023, The Guardian reported on comments Gill made in a WhatsApp group which appeared to undermine Sikh victims of sexual violence. Earlier that month, Sikh Women's Aid had published a report which found that two thirds of women surveyed had experienced domestic abuse, with many of the women criticising the inadequate response support given by community leaders. Gill was alleged to have accused the women surveyed of using "very dangerous language" and urged them to submit apologies to gurdwaras. A Labour spokesperson stated "though we cannot leak on leaked WhatsApp messages, Preet would never downplay abuse or violence".

Personal life
Gill has been married to Sureash Singh Chopra, who is a social worker, since 2009. They have two daughters. Gill is Vice-President of the Local Government Association and a non executive director for the Spring Housing Association.

Awards and nominations 
In September 2018, Gill was named as one of the Birmingham City University's Brummies Who Inspire, alongside fellow Birmingham MP, Shabana Mahmood.

In October 2018, she was presented with the Sikh Women of Substance award by the Sikh's Women Alliance UK.

In December 2018, she was one of the recipients of the Giving Voice award, presented by the Royal College of Speech and Language Therapists.

In December 2020, Gill won the overall prize at the MP of the Year Awards organised by the Patchwork Foundation, for "her consistent championing of young people, representation of the Sikh Community and initiative to tackle Fuel Poverty via a strategic campaign aimed at the UK’s biggest fuel companies."

Notes

References

External links

1972 births
Living people
21st-century British women politicians
British politicians of Indian descent
Female members of the Parliament of the United Kingdom for English constituencies
Labour Co-operative MPs for English constituencies
UK MPs 2017–2019
UK MPs 2019–present
Alumni of the University of East London
British Sikhs
21st-century English women
21st-century English people
21st-century British politicians